Wild Deep is an American documentary television series produced by Best Film Company. The series premiered on Animal Planet on January 22, 2013. The series showcases marine life at various regions in the world, such as Africa, Europe, Oceania, and the Americas.

References

Animal Planet original programming
2010s American documentary television series
English-language television shows
2013 American television series debuts
Nature educational television series
2013 American television series endings